The 2006–07 UEFA Champions League was the 15th season of UEFA's premier European club football tournament, the UEFA Champions League, since it was rebranded from the European Cup, and the 52nd season overall. The final was contested by Milan and Liverpool on 23 May 2007. Beforehand, the match was billed as a repeat of the 2005 final, the only difference being that the 2007 final was to be played at the Olympic Stadium in Athens, Greece. Milan won the match 2–1 to claim their seventh European Cup, with both goals coming from Filippo Inzaghi. Dirk Kuyt scored for Liverpool.

Barcelona were the defending champions, but were eliminated by Liverpool in the first knockout round.

Qualification
A total of 73 teams from 49 UEFA member associations participated in the 2006–07 UEFA Champions League. Liechtenstein (who don't have their own domestic league) as well as lowest-ranked Andorra and San Marino are not participating. Also wasn't admitted Montenegro, which didn't become UEFA member until January 2007. Each association enters a certain number of clubs to the Champions League based on its league coefficient, which takes into account the performance of its clubs in European competitions from 2000–01 to 2004–05; associations with a higher league coefficients may enter more clubs than associations with a lower league coefficient, but no association may enter more than four teams. Italy's representatives were decided based on the revised table following the match-fixing scandal which saw Juventus relegated to Serie B after winning the league the previous season.

Associations 1–3 each have four teams qualify.
Associations 4–6 each have three teams qualify.
Associations 7–15 each have two teams qualify.
Associations 16–50 (except Liechtenstein) each have one team qualify.

Association ranking
For the 2006–07 UEFA Champions League, the associations are allocated places according to their 2006 UEFA country coefficients, which takes into account their performance in European competitions from 2001–02 to 2005–06.

Distribution
Since the title holders (Barcelona) qualified for the Champions League group stage through their domestic league, the group stage spot reserved for the title holders is vacated, and the following changes to the default access list are made:
The champions of association 10 (Scotland) are promoted from the third qualifying round to the group stage.
The champions of association 16 (Israel) are promoted from the second qualifying round to the third qualifying round.
The champions of associations 26 and 27 (Sweden and Slovakia) are promoted from the first qualifying round to the second qualifying round.

Teams

Notes

Round and draw dates
The schedule of the competition is as follows (all draws are held at UEFA headquarters in Nyon, Switzerland, unless stated otherwise).

Qualifying rounds

First qualifying round
The first legs were played on 11 and 12 July 2006, with the second legs on 18 and 19 July.

|}

Second qualifying round
The first legs were played on 25 and 26 July 2006, with the second legs on 1 and 2 August.

|}

Third qualifying round
The first legs were played on 8 and 9 August 2006, with the second legs on 22 and 23 August.

|}

The teams eliminated in this round qualified for the first round of the UEFA Cup.

* Due to the armed conflict going on in Israel, UEFA decided that no European matches could be staged in the country until further notice. The match was played at Lobanovsky Dynamo Stadium in Kyiv, Ukraine.

Group stage

The draw for this round was held on 24 August 2006 in Monaco. The first matches were played on 12 September 2006, and the stage concluded on 6 December.

The top two teams in each group advanced to the knockout stage, and the third-placed teams entered the round of 32 of the UEFA Cup. Based on paragraph 4.05 in the UEFA regulations for the current season, if two or more teams are equal on points on completion of the group matches, the following criteria are applied to determine the rankings:
 higher number of points obtained in the group matches played among the teams in question;
 superior goal difference from the group matches played among the teams in question;
 higher number of goals scored away from home in the group matches played among the teams in question;
 superior goal difference from all group matches played;
 higher number of goals scored in all group matches played;
 higher number of coefficient points accumulated by the club in question, as well as its association, over the previous five seasons.

Levski Sofia and Copenhagen made their debut appearance in the group stage. Levski was the first Bulgarian club to appear in the Champions League group stage.

Group A

Group B

Group C

Group D

Group E

Group F

Group G

Group H

Knockout stage

All knockout rounds are two-legged, except for the final. In the event of aggregate scores being equal after normal time in the second leg, the winning team will be that which scored more goals on their away leg: if the scores in the two matches were identical, extra time is played. The away goals rule also applies if scores are equal at the end of extra time. If there are no goals scored in extra time, the tie is decided on a penalty shoot out.

Bracket

Round of 16
The draw for the first knockout round of the competition took place on 15 December 2006 in Nyon, Switzerland. The team first out of the hat in each tie plays the first leg of their tie at home, and the second leg away. This team is denoted as "Team #1" below.

On 8 February 2007, the Italian Government announced that San Siro Stadium in Milan was unsafe for spectators in light of riots that took place during and following an Italian Serie A match in Sicily. As a result, the venues of the first leg of the Inter-Valencia tie scheduled for 21 February and the second leg of the Celtic-Milan tie scheduled for 7 March were thrown into doubt. Various proposals and offers of the use of stadia outside Italy were made, but it was finally agreed that the Inter-Valencia tie would be played at the San Siro with a reduced capacity of 36,000. After further work at the San Siro, Italian authorities and UEFA announced that the second leg of Celtic-Milan would go ahead at the stadium, at its full capacity of 85,700. 4,500 seats were reserved for Celtic supporters.

The first legs were played on 20 and 21 February 2007, with the second legs on 6 and 7 March.

|}

Quarter-finals
The draw for the final stages, including the quarter-finals, semi-finals and final, was held on Friday, 9 March 2007 in Athens, Greece. The draw was conducted by ad interim UEFA CEO Gianni Infantino, assisted by Friedrich Stickler, chairman of the UEFA Club Competitions Committee. Theodoros Zagorakis, the captain of Greece in Euro 2004, was appointed ambassador for the final.

The first legs were played on 3 and 4 April, and the second legs were played on 10 and 11 April 2007.

|}

Semi-finals
The first legs were played on 24 and 25 April, with the second legs on 1 and 2 May 2007.

|}

Final

The Final took place on 23 May 2007 at the Olympic Stadium in Athens, Greece. Unlike the other knockout rounds, the final was played over just one match, with extra time in case of a draw after 90 minutes. If the teams were still level following extra time, a penalty shootout would have determined the winner.

Milan scored first through Filippo Inzaghi just before half time. Inzaghi scored again in the 82nd minute, before Dirk Kuyt scored a late consolation goal a minute before full-time.

Milan went on to represent Europe at the 2007 FIFA Club World Cup.

2006–07 UEFA Club Football Player Awards
 Club Goalkeeper of the Year: Petr Čech (Chelsea)
 Club Defender of the Year: Paolo Maldini (Milan)
 Club Midfielder of the Year: Clarence Seedorf (Milan)
 Club Forward of the Year: Kaká (Milan)
 Club Footballer of the Year: Kaká (Milan)

Statistics
Statistics exclude qualifying rounds.

Top goalscorers

Source: Top Scorers – Final – Wednesday 23 May 2007 (after match) (accessed 23 May 2007)

Top assists

Source:

See also
2006–07 UEFA Women's Cup

References

External links

 2006–07 All matches – season at UEFA website
 UEFA Champions League at uefa.com
 
 All scorers 2006–07 UEFA Champions League (excluding qualifying round) according to protocols UEFA + all scorers qualifying round
 2006/07 UEFA Champions League – results and line-ups (archive)

 
1
UEFA Champions League seasons